Joypur is a census town in the Joypur CD block in the Jhalda subdivision of the Purulia district in the state of West Bengal, India.

Geography

Location
Joypur is located at

Area overview
Purulia district forms the lowest step of the Chota Nagpur Plateau. The general scenario is undulating land with scattered hills. Jhalda subdivision, shown in the map alongside, is located in the western part of the district, bordering Jharkhand. The Subarnarekha flows along a short stretch of its western border. It is an overwhelmingly rural subdivision with 91.02% of the population living in the rural areas and 8.98% living in the urban areas. There are 3 census towns in the subdivision. The map alongside shows some of the tourist attractions in the Ajodhya Hills. The area is home to Purulia Chhau dance with spectacular masks made at Charida. The remnants of old temples and deities are found in the subdivision also, as in other parts of the district.

Note: The map alongside presents some of the notable locations in the subdivision. All places marked in the map are linked in the larger full screen map.

Demographics
According to the 2011 Census of India, Joypur had a total population of 10,259 of which 5,344 (52%) were males and 4,915 (49%) were females. There were 1,373 persons in the age range of 0 to 6 years. The total number of literate persons in Jaypur was 5,893 (66.32% of the population over 6 years).

Civic Administration

Police station
Joypur police station has jurisdiction over the Joypur CD block. The area covered is 230.50 km2 and the population covered is 133,240. It has 52 km of inter-state borders with Jaridih, Balidih and Pindrajora police stations in Bokaro district of Jharkhand.

Infrastructure
According to the District Census Handbook 2011, Puruliya, Jaypur covered an area of 8.2921 km2. There is a railway station at Garh Joypur. Among the civic amenities, the protected water supply involved tap water from treated sources. It had 757 domestic electric connections. Among the medical facilities it had dispensary/ health centre, maternity and child welfare centre and maternity home, nursing home, veterinary hospital 0.5 km away and 2 medicine shops in the town. Among the educational facilities it had were 3 primary schools, 2 senior secondary school, 1 general degree college. It had 1 non-formal education centre (Sarbya Siksha Abhiyan Centre). Among the social, recreational and cultural facilities it had 1 public library, 1 reading room. Important commodities it produced were cock industry products and muri (puffed rice). It had the branch of 1 nationalised bank and 1 cooperative bank.

Transport
State Highway 4A running from Tulin to Chas Morh (both in the Purulia district) passes through this block.

There is a station at Garh Jaipur on the Purulia-Kotshila branch line of the South Eastern Railway.

Education
Bikramjeet Goswmi Memorial College was established in 2009. Affiliated with the Sidho Kanho Birsha University, it offers honours courses in Bengali, English, history and philosophy, and a general course in arts.

Culture
Deulghata, some 6 km south of Joypur, once had 15 temples and some small shrines, built around the 9th-10th century. The Archaeological Survey of India has taken over the place that includes three tall surviving temples.

Healthcare
Joypur Rural Hospital, with 30 beds, is a major government medical facility in Joypur CD block.

References

Cities and towns in Purulia district